New musicology is a wide body of musicology since the 1980s with a focus upon the cultural study, aesthetics, criticism, and hermeneutics of music. It began in part a reaction against the traditional positivist musicology (focused on primary research) of the early 20th century and postwar era. Many of the procedures of new musicology are considered standard, although the name more often refers to the historical turn rather than to any single set of ideas or principles. Indeed, although it was notably influenced by feminism, gender studies, queer theory, postcolonial studies, and critical theory, new musicology has primarily been characterized by a wide-ranging eclecticism.

Definitions and history
New musicology seeks to question the research methods of traditional musicology by displacing positivism, working in partnership with outside disciplines, including the humanities and social sciences, and by questioning accepted musical knowledge. New musicologists seek ways to employ anthropology, sociology, cultural studies, gender studies, feminism, history, and philosophy in the study of music. 

In 1980 Joseph Kerman published the article "How We Got into Analysis, and How to Get Out," calling for a change in musicology. He asked for "a new breadth and flexibility in academic music criticism [musicology]"  (Kerman, 1994, 30) that would extend to musical discourse, critical theory and analysis. In the words of Rose Rosengard Subotnik: "For me...the notion of an intimate relationship between music and society functions not as a distant goal but as a starting point of great immediacy...the goal of which is to articulate something essential about why any particular music is the way it is in particular, that is, to achieve insight into the character of its identity."

Susan McClary suggests that new musicology defines music as "a medium that participates in social formation by influencing the ways we perceive our feelings, our bodies, our desires, our very subjectivities—even if it does so surreptitiously, without most of us knowing how" (Brett, 1994).  For Lawrence Kramer, music has meanings "definite enough to support critical interpretations comparable in depth, exactness, and density of connection to interpretations of literary texts and cultural practices" (Kramer, 1990).

New musicology combines cultural studies with the analysis and criticism of music, and it accords more weight to the sociology of musicians and institutions and to non-canonical genres of music, including jazz and popular music, than traditional musicology did. (A similar perspective became common for American ethnomusicologists during the 1950s.) This has caused many musicologists to question previously held views of authenticity and to make assessments based on critical methods "concerned with finding some kind of synthesis between [musical] analysis and a consideration of social meaning" (Beard and Gloag, 2005, 38).

New musicologists question the processes of canonization. Gary Tomlinson suggests that meaning be searched out in a "series of interrelated historical narratives that surround the musical subject" (Beard and Gloag, 2005, 123) – a "web of culture" (Tomlinson, 1984). For example, the work of Beethoven has been examined from new perspectives by studying his reception and influence in terms of masculine hegemony, the development of the modern concert, and the politics of his era, among other concerns.  The traditional contrast between Beethoven and Schubert has been revised in the light of these studies, especially with reference to Schubert's possible homosexuality (McClary in Brett, 1994; Kramer 2003; Mathew, 2012).

Relationship to music sociology
New musicology is distinct from German music sociology in the work of Adorno, Max Weber and Ernst Bloch. Although some new musicologists claim some allegiance to Theodor Adorno, their work has little in common with the wider field of Adorno studies, especially in Germany. New musicologists frequently exhibit strong resistance to German intellectual traditions, especially in regard to nineteenth-century German music theorists including Adolf Bernhard Marx and Eduard Hanslick, and also the twentieth-century figures Heinrich Schenker and Carl Dahlhaus.

A fundamental distinction has to do with attitudes towards modernism and popular culture. Influential, oft-cited essays such as McClary 1989 and McClary 2006 are highly dismissive of modernist music. German music sociologists tend to be more favorable towards modernism (though by no means uncritically) and severely critical of popular music as inextricably tied to the aesthetics of distraction as demanded by the culture industry. Metzger describes "a fascistic element" in the music of the Rolling Stones. New musicology, on the other hand, often overlaps with postmodern aesthetics; various new musicologists are highly sympathetic towards musical minimalism (see McClary 1990 and 2000 and Fink 2005).

Criticisms of new musicology
Vincent Duckles writes, "As musicology has grown more pluralistic, its practitioners have increasingly adopted methods and theories deemed by observers to mark the academy as irrelevant, out of touch with 'mainstream values', unwelcoming of Western canonic traditions or simply incomprehensible. Paradoxically, such approaches have distanced music scholarship from a broad public at the very moment they have encouraged scholars to scrutinize the popular musics that form the backbone of modern mass musical culture."

Critics of new musicology include Pieter van den Toorn and to a lesser extent Charles Rosen. In response to an early essay of McClary (McClary 1987), Rosen says that "she sets up, like so many of the 'new musicologists', a straw man to knock down, the dogma that music has no meaning, and no political or social significance. (I doubt that anyone, except perhaps the nineteenth-century critic Hanslick, has ever really believed that, although some musicians have been goaded into proclaiming it by the sillier interpretations of music with which we are often assailed.)" (Rosen 2000).  For David Beard and Kenneth Gloag, however, writing at two later moments (2005, 2016), the methods of new musicology have been fully incorporated into mainstream musicological practice.

References

Agawu, Kofi (2003). Representing African Music: Postcolonial Notes, Queries, Positions. Taylor & Francis.
Beard, David and Kenneth Gloag (2005; 2nd, edition 2016). Musicology: The Key Concepts. Routledge.
Carter, Tim (2002). "An American In," review-article of McClary Conventional Wisdom, in Music and Letters, Vol. 83 No. 2, pp. 274–279.
Vincent Duckles, et al. "Musicology." Grove Music Online. Oxford Music Online. 4 Oct. 2011 <http://www.oxfordmusiconline.com/subscriber/article/grove/music/46710pg3>.
Feldman, Morton; Earle Brown; and Heinz-Klaus Metzger (1972). Morton Feldman, Earle Brown and Heinz-Klaus Metzger in Discussion
Heile, Björn (2004). "Darmstadt as Other: British and American Responses to Musical Modernism" in twentieth-century music, Vol. 1 Issue 02, pp. 161–178.
Hisama, Ellie M. (2001). Gendering Musical Modernism: The Music of Ruth Crawford, Marion Bauer, and Miriam Gideon. Cambridge University Press. .
Kramer, Lawrence (1990). Music as Cultural Practice, 1800-1900.
McClary, Susan (1987). "The blasphemy of talking politics during Bach Year," in McClary and Leppert, Richard, eds. Music and Society: The politics of composition, performance and reception. Cambridge University Press.
McClary, Susan (1989).  "Terminal Prestige: The Case of Avant-Garde Music Composition" in Cultural Critique 12 (1989), pp. 57–81.
McClary, Susan (2000). "Women and Music on the Verge of the New Millennium," in Signs Vol. 25 No. 4, pp. 1283–1286.
McClary, Susan (2006). "The World According to Taruskin," in Music and Letters Vol. 87 No. 3, pp. 408–415.
Mathew, Nicholas (2012).  "Political Beethoven."  University of California Press.
O'Neill, Maggie, ed. (1999). Adorno, Culture and Feminism. Sage Publications.
Rosen, Charles (2000). "The New Musicology," in Critical Entertainments: Music Old and New, pp. 255–272. Harvard University Press.
Ross, Alex (2003). 'Ghost Sonata: Adorno and German Music'
Rycenga, Jennifer (2002). "Queerly Amiss: Sexuality and the Logic of Adorno's Dialectics," in Gibson, Nigel and Rubin, Andrew, eds. Adorno: A Critical Reader. Blackwell.
Subotnik, Rose Rosengard (1991). Developing Variations: Style and Ideology in Western Music. Minneapolis: University of Minnesota Press. .
Taruskin, Richard (2005). "Speed Bumps," in 19th-Century Music, Vol. 29 No.2, pp. 185–207.
Watson, Ben (1995). "McClary and Postmodernism" in Frank Zappa: The Negative Dialectics of Poodle Play. Quartet Books.

Further reading
Kerman, Joseph (1985). Contemplating Music: Challenges to Musicology. UK edition: Musicology.
McClary, Susan and Leppert, Richard, eds. (1987). Music and Society: The politics of composition, performance and reception.
McClary, Susan (1991). Feminine Endings.
Subotnik, Rose Rosengard (1991). Developing Variations: Style and Ideology in Western Music.
Solie, Ruth, ed. (1993). Musicology and Difference.
Tomlinson, Gary (1993). Music in Renaissance Magic: Toward a Historiography of Others.
Citron, Marcia (1993). Gender and the Musical Canon.
Brett, Philip, Wood, Elizabeth and Thomas, Gary C., eds. (1994). Queering the Pitch: The New Gay and Lesbian Musicology.
Kramer, Lawrence (1995). Classical Music and Postmodern Knowledge.
Subotnik, Rose Rosengard (1996). Deconstructive Variations: Music and Reason in Western Society.
Van den Toorn, Pieter C. (1996). Music, Politics and the Academy.
DeNora, Tia (1996). Beethoven and the Construction of Genius: Musical Politics in Vienna, 1792-1803.
Schwarz, David (1997). Listening Subjects: Music Psychoanalysis, Culture.
Kramer, Lawrence (1997). After the Lovedeath: Sexual Violence and the Making of Culture. University of California Press.
Bellman, Jonathan, ed. (1998). The Exotic in Western Music.
Fink, Robert.  (1998) Elvis Everywhere: Musicology and Popular Music Studies at the Twilight of the Canon.
Cook, Nicholas and Everist, Mark, ed. (1999). Rethinking Music.
McClary, Susan (2000). Conventional Wisdom.
Born, Georgina and Hesmondhalgh, David (2000). Western Music and Its Others: Difference, Representation, and Appropriation in Music.
Pederson, Sanna (2000). 'Beethoven and Masculinity', in Burnham, Scott and Steinberg, Michael P. (eds), Beethoven and his World, pp. 313–331.
Williams, Alistair (2001). Constructing Musicology. Ashgate.
Kramer, Lawrence (2003). Franz Schubert: Sexuality, Subjectivity, Song. Cambridge University Press.
Taruskin, Richard (2005). The Oxford History of Western Music (six volumes).
Fink, Robert (2005). Repeating Ourselves: American Minimal Music as Cultural Practice.
Davidović, Dalibor (2006). Identität und Musik: Zwischen Kritik und Technik (Identity and Music: Between Criticism and Technique), Vienna: Mille Tre.
Ross, Alex (2007). The Rest is Noise: Listening to the Twentieth Century. Farrar, Straus and Giroux.
Szendy, Peter (2007). Listen, A History of Our Ears. Fordham University Press.

External links

 Contemporary Music Theory and the New Musicology: An Introduction
The New York Review of Books: MUSIC À LA MODE by Lawrence Kramer, reply by Charles Rosen, Volume 41, Number 15 · September 22, 1994
GregSandow.com: Beethoven Howls Village Voice, December 17, 1985
GregSandow.com The Secret of the Silver Ticket Village Voice, April 1, 1986, see deconstruction
The comeback of systematic musicology
Original version of article for New Grove on 'Lesbian and Gay Music', by Philip Brett and Elizabeth Wood

Musicology